Thomas Henry Brand, 4th Viscount Hampden CMG (30 March 1900 – 17 October 1965) was a British and English peer, both Baron Dacre (dating from 1307) and Viscount Hampden.

The son of Thomas Brand, 3rd Viscount Hampden GCVO, KCB, CMG, and of Lady Katharine Mary Montagu-Douglas-Scott, a daughter of the 6th Duke of Buccleuch, he was educated at Eton, holding the office of Page of Honour to King George V between 1913 and 1916. After Eton, he joined the British Army and was commissioned as a Lieutenant into the Rifle Brigade.

On 26 July 1923, he married Leila, daughter of Lieutenant-Colonel Frank Seely, of Ramsdale Park, Nottinghamshire and son of Sir Charles Seely, 1st Baronet. They had four daughters, Sarah Elizma (1924–1937), Gian Katherine (1927–1929), Rachel Leila (1929–2012), and Tessa Mary ( 1934-2020).

In 1931 he became Managing Director of Lazard Brothers & Co. During the Second World War he served as Chief Executive Officer on the British side of the Combined Production and Resources Board, from 1942 to 1944, then from 1944 to 1945 was Chairman of Supplies for Liberated Areas Official Committee. He was appointed CMG in 1943, and in 1953 and 1954 was Chairman of the Issuing Houses Association. He succeeded to his father's titles in 1958 and in 1965 became Chairman of Lazards.

After Hampden's death on 17 October 1965 his brother David succeeded as Viscount Hampden, while his two surviving daughters were left as co-heiresses to the Barony of Dacre, which thus went into abeyance. However, the abeyance was terminated in 1970 in favour of his elder surviving daughter Rachel Douglas-Home, 27th Baroness Dacre.

References

1900 births
1965 deaths
26
British bankers
Companions of the Order of St Michael and St George
Pages of Honour
People educated at Eton College
Rifle Brigade officers
4